Declan Martin Patrick Moore (born 5 July 1975) is a former Irish first-class cricketer.

Moore was born in Dublin and played his club cricket for The Hills. Prior to playing first-class cricket, Moore held an amateur jockey license. He spent the winter of 1995 in New Zealand, where he played club cricket for Mount Manganui Cricket Club, and came close to selection for the Northern Districts. Returning to Ireland, he made his debut for Ireland in a List A one-day match against Gloucestershire in the 1996 Benson & Hedges Cup at Dublin, when he was called up as a late replacement for Uel Graham. The following week he played against Surrey in the competition at Eglinton, before following this up in June with another List A appearance against Sussex at Hove in the NatWest Trophy. In August 1996, he made his only appearance in first-class cricket for Ireland against Scotland at Linlithgow. In a drawn match, Moore batted twice, scoring 51 runs in Ireland's first-innings before being dismissed by James Govan, while in their second-innings he was dismissed by Mike Allingham. Across both of Scotland's innings, he also bowled six wicket-less overs. Moore made a final List A appearance for Ireland against Glamorgan at Cardiff in the 1997 NatWest Trophy. This was his last major appearance for Ireland. Moore struggled to make an impact in his four List A appearances for Ireland, scoring just 15 runs at a low average of 3.75, and a highest score of 10.

References

External links

1975 births
Living people
Cricketers from Dublin (city)
Irish cricketers